Paulus Hungarus (Paul the Hungarian; ca. 1180 - 10 February 1241) was a Hungarian friar of the Dominican Order who lived during the thirteenth century, and is author of the Summa poenitentiae, Hungarus also annotated Compilatio I-III, a collection of Canon law. Hungarus planned a network of monasteries throughout the Kingdom of Hungary to act as a bulwark against heresy, one of which is the Biserica Mănăstirii Dominicane in Sighişoara.

References

Bibliography 

12th-century Hungarian people
13th-century Hungarian people
Hungarian Dominicans
Dominican theologians
1180 births
1241 deaths